Cora inversa is a species of basidiolichen in the family Hygrophoraceae. Found in Colombia, it was formally described as a new species in 2013 by lichenologists Robert Lücking and Bibiana Moncada. Here the lichen grows as an epiphyte, typically at the base of páramo shrubs, and often between bryophytes. The specific epithet refers to the partially strigose (i.e., with dense, short, hair-like projections) underside, presenting in an inverse fashion compared to Cora hirsuta, which is strigose on the upper side.

References

inversa
Lichen species
Lichens described in 2013
Lichens of Colombia
Taxa named by Robert Lücking
Basidiolichens